JNK1-associated membrane protein is a protein that in humans is encoded by the JKAMP gene.

References

Further reading